Let Go is a 2011 comedy-drama film starring David Denman. It was written and directed by Brian Jett.

Plot
The film centers around the interlocking lives of a bored parole officer and three eccentric ex-convicts recently placed under his supervision.

Cast
 David Denman as Walter Dishman
 Gillian Jacobs as Darla DeMint
 Kevin Hart as Kris Styles
 Ed Asner as Artie Satz 
 Simon Helberg as Frank
 Maria Thayer as Beth
 Alexandra Holden as Kelly
 Kali Hawk as Angela
 Ogy Durham as Vanessa

Production
It was filmed in Los Angeles, shot in just 24 days.  The cast, which includes Denman from The Office and Jacobs from Community, worked for SAG independent film scale.  Writer-director Brian Jett cited influences including Dustin Hoffman drama Straight Time.

Release
The film was released October 25, 2011 at the Austin Film Festival, October 31, 2011 at the Savannah International Film Festival before being released in the United States on August 21, 2012.

Critical response
CultureMap considered it a flop: they criticised it for poor technical quality, citing bad lighting, sound, and cinematography, and also felt the script did not give a talented cast much to do.

Magdalena Bresson praised the performances from a variety of actors known for TV comedy, and the film's visual qualities, particularly its use of color.

References

External links
 
 

American independent films
2011 films
2010s English-language films
2010s American films